Closing Down the Pattern Department is Daphne Loves Derby's debut EP. It features Come Winter, which was previously released on their internet-only debut Daphne Loves Derby. "We Bet the Willing" was originally recorded by Kenny Choi in his solo project, Desperado Revenge. The original release of Closing Down the Pattern Department did not feature "These Ghosts, My Hopes, the Sand, the Sea".

Track listing
 "We Bet the Willing" (Kenny Choi) – 1:02
 "Closing Down The Pattern Department" (Daphne Loves Derby) – 4:03
 "Come Winter" (Choi) – 3:45
 "Deserts Eating Oceans" (Choi) – 4:56
 "These Ghosts, My Hopes, the Sand, the Sea" (Choi) – 9:00

References

2004 debut EPs
Daphne Loves Derby albums